Rycerzewko  is a village in the administrative district of Gmina Świdwin, within Świdwin County, West Pomeranian Voivodeship, in north-western Poland.

The village has a population of 73.

See also
History of Pomerania

References

Rycerzewko